Donald George Calfa (December 3, 1939 – December 1, 2016) was an American film and television character actor whose credits spanned over 40 years, playing both comedic and dramatic roles. Although Calfa appeared in many high-profile films and television series, he was perhaps best known for his role as mortician Ernie Kaltenbrunner in the 1985 cult horror-comedy The Return of the Living Dead, and the bumbling hitman in Weekend at Bernie's.

Early life and education
Calfa was born on December 3, 1939 in Brooklyn, New York, and was raised in Ozone Park, Queens and later West Hempstead, Long Island. According to his official biography, Calfa was originally interested in pursuing a career in the fine arts, but diverted his interest to acting after seeing Rebel Without a Cause. He promptly dropped out of high school to join a theater workshop (later finishing his degree through night school), eventually joining both the Actors' Equity Association and the Screen Actors Guild.

Career
Before transitioning to film, Calfa worked heavily in theater, appearing in many Off-Off-Broadway productions and having performed on Broadway in 1965 in Mating Dance and in 1971 in Lenny.

Calfa worked steadily in both film and television for over 40 years, and worked alongside such high-profile actors and directors as Warren Beatty, Michael Douglas, Jack Nicholson, Martin Scorsese and Steven Spielberg. Although he worked extensively as a dramatic actor, Calfa is perhaps best recognized for his comedic performances in various cult films, including as Paulie in Weekend at Bernie's, Scarface in Foul Play, Harold Grand in Treasure of the Moon Goddess and mad scientist Ralph Willum in Chopper Chicks in Zombietown.

Calfa was perhaps best known for his major role in the 1985 cult horror-comedy The Return of the Living Dead, in which he played the eccentric mortician Ernie Kaltenbrunner. He would later audition for the role of Doc Mandel in the 1988 sequel Return of the Living Dead Part II, which also featured several returning stars from the original, but the part ultimately went to Philip Bruns. In 1993, Calfa was set to play the character Colonel Peck in Return of the Living Dead III, but had to pull out of production due to personal reasons. He remained good friends with the rest of the Living Dead cast and crew, and made appearances alongside them at horror conventions and screenings of the film across the United States. Calfa was also interviewed for the 2012 documentary on the film, More Brains! A Return to the Living Dead.

Calfa appeared in many other popular American television series, including Kojak (2 episodes), Baretta, The Streets of San Francisco (3 episodes), The Bionic Woman, Benson, Night Court, Simon & Simon, Hill Street Blues (2 episodes), Matlock, Twin Peaks, Doogie Howser, M.D. (3 episodes), Murder She Wrote (2 episodes), and Beverly Hills 90210 (3 episodes). He played 7 different characters on 7 episodes of Barney Miller.

Personal life and death
Calfa was a member of the Academy of Motion Picture Arts and Sciences. He had been a close friend and colleague of fellow actor Richard Lynch since the 1960s, and acted alongside him in H.P. Lovecraft's: Necronomicon (1993), Toughguy (1995), Corpses Are Forever (2003) and Lewisburg (2010). He was married to Trixie Flynn (from September 10, 1977 – August 26, 1981); the union ended in divorce.

Calfa died on December 1, 2016, at his home in Yucca Valley, California, aged 76.

Filmography

Film roles

Television roles

References

External links
  (archive of May 22, 2012, on archive.org)
 

1939 births
2016 deaths
Male actors from New York City
American male film actors
American male stage actors
American male television actors
20th-century American male actors
People from Queens, New York
People from West Hempstead, New York